The canton of Fleurance-Lomagne is an administrative division of the Gers department, southwestern France. It was created at the French canton reorganisation which came into effect in March 2015. Its seat is in Fleurance.

It consists of the following communes:
 
Avezan
Bivès
Brugnens
Cadeilhan
Castelnau-d'Arbieu
Castéron
Céran
Cézan
Estramiac
Fleurance
Gaudonville
Gavarret-sur-Aulouste
Goutz
Lalanne
Lamothe-Goas
Magnas
Mauroux
Miramont-Latour
Montestruc-sur-Gers
Pauilhac
Pessoulens
Pis
Préchac
Puységur
Réjaumont
Saint-Clar
Saint-Créac
Sainte-Radegonde
Saint-Léonard
La Sauvetat
Taybosc
Tournecoupe
Urdens

References

Cantons of Gers